Serbia competed at the 2016 Summer Olympics in Rio de Janeiro, Brazil, from 5 to 21 August 2016. It was the nation's fourth appearance at the Summer Olympics as an independent country. The Olympic Committee of Serbia confirmed a roster of 103 athletes, 58 men and 45 women, to compete across 14 sports at the Games.

Serbia left Rio de Janeiro with a total of 8 medals (2 gold, 4 silver, and 2 bronze), achieving the nation's most successful feat in Summer Olympic history since the break-up of Yugoslavia, and also doubling its previous medal tally from the 2012 Summer Olympics in London. 54 Serbian athletes (about 52 percent of the whole team) contributed to the medal count, with the majority of those coming in the signature team sports (men's water polo, men's and women's basketball, and women's volleyball).

Five Serbian athletes collected medals in individual sports. Among them were Greco-Roman wrestler Davor Štefanek, the first Serbian to win an Olympic gold in the sport after 32 years; long jumper Ivana Španović, the nation's first track and field athlete to stand on the Olympic podium in six decades; taekwondo fighter Tijana Bogdanović, who captured a silver in the women's flyweight category (49 kg); and kayak tandem Marko Tomićević and Milenko Zorić, who were runners-up in the long-distance double (men's K-2 1000 m).

Medalists

| width=78% align=left valign=top |

| width=22% align=left valign=top |
|  style="text-align:left; width:22%; vertical-align:top;"|

Competitors
The Olympic Committee of Serbia fielded a team of 103 athletes, 58 men and 45 women, across fourteen sports at the Games. It was the nation's second-largest delegation sent to the Olympics, falling short of the record for the most number of athletes (116) achieved in London four years earlier by nearly 12 percent. Serbia qualified teams in men's water polo and women's volleyball, as well as both the men's and women's basketball for the first time in its Olympic history.

Traditional collective sports accounted for nearly half of the nation's roster, amassing a combined total of 49 athletes. By individual-based sport, however, track and field constituted the largest percentage of athletes on the Serbian team, with 12 entries. There was a single competitor each in road cycling, mountain biking, judo, and table tennis.

Highlighting the list of Serbian athletes were Beijing 2008 bronze medalist Novak Djokovic, who entered the Games as the world's top-ranked tennis player in the men's singles, and taekwondo fighter Milica Mandić, who became the country's first ever Olympic champion in London four years earlier. Rifle shooting legend Stevan Pletikosić, who officially made his sixth Olympic appearance, topped the nation's roster lineup as the oldest and most experienced competitor (aged 43). Meanwhile, Pletikosic's female counterpart Ivana Anđušić Maksimović, who followed her father Goran's sporting legacy to win a silver medal in the small-bore rifle at London 2012, acted as the flag bearer for the Serbian team in the opening ceremony.

Other notable athletes on the Serbian roster included long jumper and European outdoor champion Ivana Španović, pistol shooters Zorana Arunović (European Games gold medalist) and Andrea Arsović (European champion and world's top-ranked), freestyle swimmer and London 2012 finalist Velimir Stjepanović, water polo team captain Živko Gocić, and basketballers Miloš Teodosić (team captain and EuroLeague champion), Nikola Jokić  (who currently played for NBA's Denver Nuggets) and Ana Dabović (WNBA's Los Angeles Sparks and EuroBasket MVP).

The following is the list of number of competitors participating in the Games:

Athletics

Serbian athletes have so far achieved qualifying standards in the following athletics events (up to a maximum of 3 athletes in each event):

Track & road events
Men

Women

Field events

Combined events – Men's decathlon

Basketball

Men's tournament

Serbia men's basketball team qualified for the Olympics by securing its lone outright berth and winning the final match over Puerto Rico at the Belgrade leg of the 2016 FIBA World Qualifying Tournament, signifying the nation's debut in the sport since it gained independence from Montenegro in 2006.

Team roster

Group play

Quarterfinal

Semifinal

Gold medal match

Women's tournament

The Serbian women's basketball team qualified for the Olympics by winning the EuroBasket Women 2015 in Hungary.

Team roster

Group play

Quarterfinal

Semifinal

Bronze medal match

Canoeing

Sprint

Serbian canoeists have qualified one boat in each of the following events through the 2015 ICF Canoe Sprint World Championships.

Men

Women

Qualification Legend: FA = Qualify to final (medal); FB = Qualify to final B (non-medal)

Cycling

Road
Serbia has qualified one rider in the men's Olympic road race by virtue of his top 200 individual ranking in the 2015 UCI Europe Tour.

Mountain biking
Serbia has qualified one mountain biker for the women's Olympic cross-country race, as a result of her nation's seventeenth-place finish in the UCI Olympic Ranking List of 25 May 2016.

Judo

Serbia has qualified one judoka for the men's middleweight category (90 kg) at the Games. Aleksander Kukolj was directly ranked among the top 22 eligible judokas for men in the IJF World Ranking List of 30 May 2016.

Rowing

Serbia has qualified two boats for each of the following rowing classes into the Olympic regatta. One rowing crew had confirmed Olympic place for their boat in the men's pair at the 2015 FISA World Championships in Lac d'Aiguebelette, France, while the men's double sculls rowers had added one more boat to the Serbian roster as a result of their top two finish at the 2016 European & Final Qualification Regatta in Lucerne, Switzerland.

Qualification Legend: FA=Final A (medal); FB=Final B (non-medal); FC=Final C (non-medal); FD=Final D (non-medal); FE=Final E (non-medal); FF=Final F (non-medal); SA/B=Semifinals A/B; SC/D=Semifinals C/D; SE/F=Semifinals E/F; QF=Quarterfinals; R=Repechage

Shooting

Serbian shooters have achieved quota places for the following events by virtue of their best finishes at the 2014 ISSF World Shooting Championships, the 2015 ISSF World Cup series, and European Championships or Games, as long as they obtained a minimum qualifying score (MQS) by 31 March 2016.

The entire shooting squad was named to the Serbian roster for the Games on 6 July 2016, with rifle specialist Stevan Pletikosić becoming the first male shooter to compete at his sixth Olympics. Notable absence in the roster was pistol legend Jasna Šekarić, who bid to establish a historic milestone as one of the first female athletes, alongside Georgian shooter Nino Salukvadze to appear in eight editions of the Games.

Men

Women

Swimming

Serbian swimmers have so far achieved qualifying standards in the following events (up to a maximum of 2 swimmers in each event at the Olympic Qualifying Time (OQT), and potentially 1 at the Olympic Selection Time (OST)):

Table tennis

Serbia has entered one athlete into the table tennis competition at the Games. Aleksandar Karakašević granted an invitation from ITTF to compete in the men's singles as one of the next seven highest-ranked eligible players, not yet qualified, on the Olympic Ranking List.

Taekwondo

Serbia entered two athletes into the taekwondo competition at the Olympics. Reigning Olympic champion Milica Mandić qualified automatically for the women's heavyweight category (+67 kg) by finishing in the top 6 WTF Olympic rankings. 2015 European Games silver medalist Tijana Bogdanović secured the remaining spot on the Serbian team by virtue of her top two finish in the women's flyweight category (49 kg) at the 2016 European Qualification Tournament in Istanbul, Turkey.

Tennis

Serbia has entered six tennis players (three men and three women) into the Olympic tournament. Beijing 2008 bronze medalist and world no. 1 seed Novak Djokovic and London 2012 Olympian Viktor Troicki (world no. 21) qualified directly for the men's singles as three of the top 56 eligible players in the ATP World Rankings, while Ana Ivanovic (world no. 25) and three-time Olympian Jelena Janković (world no. 24) did so for the women's singles based on their WTA World Rankings as of 6 June 2016.

Having been directly entered to the singles, Djokovic and Janković also opted to play with their partners Nenad Zimonjić and Aleksandra Krunić, respectively, in the men's and women's doubles.

Volleyball

Indoor

Women's tournament

The Serbian women's volleyball team qualified for the Olympics by reaching the top two towards the final match of the 2015 FIVB Volleyball Women's World Cup in Japan.

Team roster

Group play

Quarterfinal

Semifinal

Gold medal match

Water polo

Summary

Men's tournament

The Serbian men's water polo team qualified for the Olympics by winning the 2015 FINA World League Super Final in Italy.

Team roster

Group play

Quarterfinal

Semifinal

Gold medal match

Wrestling

Serbia has qualified three wrestlers for each the following weight classes into the Olympic competition. One of them finished among the top six to secure an Olympic spot in the men's Greco-Roman 66 kg at the  2015 World Championships, while two more Olympic places were awarded to Serbian wrestlers, who progressed to the top two finals at the 2016 European Qualification Tournament.

Men's Greco-Roman

Reaction to Kosovo's participation
Because of Albanian boycotts after the breakup of Yugoslavia, only Serbs from Kosovo participated as part of Serbia and Montenegro and Serbia at the Olympics. On 17 February 2008 Kosovo's Parliament declared independence from Serbia, but Serbia doesn't recognize it and considers it its southern province. On 9 December 2014 the International Olympic Committee recognized the Olympic Committee of Kosovo therefore Kosovo is a participant at the 2016 Summer Olympics in Rio de Janeiro, Brazil.

In reaction to the decision of the International Olympic Committee to accept Kosovo as a full member, Vlade Divac said that the Serbian Olympic Committee did all they could while foreign minister Ivica Dačić and minister of sports Vanja Udovičić expressed disapproval, with Divac adding there would be no boycott of the games. Prior to the Rio 2016 opening ceremony, Udovičić advised Serbian athletes to withdraw themselves from any medal ceremonies if they have to share the podium with athletes from Kosovo. Some athletes from Kosovo, such as volleyball player Milena Rašić and basketball player Marko Simonović, participated as part of the Serbian team and both of them won medals.

See also
Serbia at the 2016 Summer Paralympics

References

External links 

 Olympic Committee of Serbia
 

Olympics
Nations at the 2016 Summer Olympics
2016